Dabong Bridge is a bridge in Dabong, Kelantan, Malaysia. It was built between 2004 and 2006. This bridge was officially opened on 20 August 2006 by Malaysian Prime Minister Abdullah Ahmad Badawi.

See also
 Transport in Malaysia

References

2006 establishments in Malaysia
Bridges in Kelantan
Bridges completed in 2006
Kuala Krai District